GHD Group Pty Ltd (formerly known as Gutteridge Haskins & Davey) is a global employee-owned multinational technical professional services firm providing advisory, architecture and design, buildings, digital, energy and resources, environmental, geosciences, project management, transportation and water services.

GHD employs more than 11,000 people—engineers, architects, planners, scientists, project managers and economists— operating in over 200 offices across five continents serving clients in water, energy and resources, environment, property and buildings, and transportation markets. GHD has delivered projects in over 135 countries.

History
GHD was founded as a private practice in Melbourne, Australia in 1928 by Alan Gordon Gutteridge who operated as a consulting engineer with focuses on water and sewerage. The partnership of Gerald Haskins and Geoffrey Innes Davey joined with Gutteridge's practice in 1939, establishing the formal partnership of Gutteridge Haskins & Davey. During the 1950s and 60s GHD grew to more than 400 employees while expanding into transportation, manufacturing plants, building and civil works, energy, mining and dams. A notable project of the 1960s was the extension of potable water and sewage infrastructure across Tasmania. GHD expanded globally in the 1970s with a joint venture in Malaysia.

During the 1990s GHD expanded its services into architecture, environmental and business consulting while expanding its presence in Southeast Asia. During the 2000s GHD continued to grow through a series of mergers and acquisitions in the US, Canada, Europe, Australia, New Zealand, the Middle East, China, Chile and Malaysia. By 2013 GHD had grown to more than 1000 employees in North America.

In 2014, GHD merged with Canadian firm Conestoga-Rovers & Associates in one of the largest private stock transactions in the engineering and environmental consulting industry, creating a combined company of 8,500 employees. At the time of the merger Conestoga-Rovers had about 3,000 employees mostly in North America and the United Kingdom, while GHD had 5,500 employees across five continents. The combined company became the sixth-largest employee-owned engineering consultancy in the world, with $1.5 billion in combined revenue. Also in 2014, GHD acquired the brand and business of Australian architecture firm Woodhead, later renamed GHD Woodhead.

In 2018 GHD opened a new North American headquarters facility in Waterloo, Ontario. At that time, the company said that the North American region accounted for over half of GHD's  global revenue.

GHD ranks #9 in international design firms operating in the US and #8 in Canada according to Engineering News-Record’s 2021 annual survey of key market segments.

Market sectors
 In FY2022 28% of revenues were in the Environment sector, 25% in transportation, 17% in water, 17% in property and buildings, and 13% in Energy and resources. GHD saw 6.3% organic growth on FY2021 with revenues of 2.322 Billion AUD (1.617 Billion USD). 

 Water – As of 2018, eighteen percent of GHD’s revenues were derived from water-related design services. Past projects have included desalination projects for the City of Carlsbad, Camp Pendleton, City of Huntington Beach and South Orange County in the US, the Brisbane and Christchurch rebuilding efforts, Manila Sewerage implementation, Codelco Colon Processing Plant in Chile and the Oakura Sewerage scheme in New Zealand. GHD designed and administered the contract to upgrade the Hespeler trunk sanitary sewer line for the city of Cambridge, Ontario without digging a 2 km trench through an environmentally sensitive area. It also designed a tunnel aqueduct for Manila Water to provide water to approximately 7 million people. It designed and constructed two Ultraviolet Disinfection surface water treatment facilities for Westchester County, New York. It constructed a water treatment system using membrane bioreactor technology to provide 100,000 gallons of reclaimed water per day for Wickenburg, Arizona.
 Energy & Resources – As of 2018, sixteen percent of GHD’s revenues were derived from energy and resources. Past projects of note include the Hawsons Magnetite Iron Ore Mine in Australia, QCLNG Export Pipeline in Australia and the Taysan Copper Mine in the Philippines. Within Australia the company is working with both renewable and baseload generators to help navigate from a coal-reliant power grid to one balanced with wind and solar power. Recent projects include Front End Engineering Design for a project developed by Tourian Renewables Limited aimed at turning waste plastic into fuels, oils and chemicals; and the expansion of the Sales de Jujuy lithium carbonate plant in Argentina.
 Environment – As of 2018, twenty-seven percent of GHD’s revenues were generated from environmental services. Past projects of note include the HydroAysen Transmission System in Chile, Minimbah Bank Third Track Biodiversity project and the Townsville Marine Precinct, both in Australia. Recent projects include the installation of an articulated concrete block mat and sand-water slurry to remediate industrial contamination of Bayou d'Inde in Louisiana; advisement for the North East Link Authority on its road infrastructure project in Victoria; and conversion of a landfill in the Mariana Islands to a park, including the installation of drainage and liner systems reducing the amount of contaminated water and protection from erosion in adherence to EPA regulations.
 Property & Buildings – As of 2018, seventeen percent of GHD’s revenues were generated from property and buildings. Past projects of note include the Al Walkra Hospital in Qatar, the Kerikeri Police Station in New Zealand and Richlands Rail Station in Australia. Recent projects include construction of the Barwon Water head office in Geelong, Victoria; restoration of Grantley Hall in North Yorkshire; and engineering design services for the redevelopment of Qasr Al Hosn in Abu Dhabi.
 Transportation – As of 2018, twenty-two percent of GHD’s revenues were generated from transportation. Past projects of note in include the Ahuriri to Napier Transportation Link in New Zealand, the San Antonio Port Expansion in Chile and South Road Superway in South Australia. Recent projects include the implementation of a multi-lane roundabout on Highway 68 in Monterey, California, including the project management, traffic analysis, and specialty engineering design; business case development and economic assessment, including highway and bridge concept designs, for New Zealand State Highway 3 connecting the Manawatū-Whanganui and Hawke’s Bay regions; and the design and construction of 1 km of acoustic barriers along New Zealand State Highway 1 to mitigate noise and air pollution.
 Digital – GHD employs over 500 technology professionals who provide data analytics, location intelligence, cyber security, virtual and augmented reality technology services. Recent projects include the creation of a connected site for the Level Crossing Removal Authority to facilitate data handling and sharing across a complex rail infrastructure upgrade; and preparation of a smart city framework, roadmap and governance process for Glenelg Shire, Victoria.

Achievements
In 2018 GHD was ranked 16th in Financial Review’s annual top 500 private companies in Australia list and 29th in Engineering News-Record’s annual Top 150 Global Design Firms. The International Water Association named awarded GHD's Birmingham Resilience Project the bronze medal for Exceptional Project Execution and Delivery at its 2018 Innovation Awards. The American Council of Engineering Companies of California honored GHD for Comprehensive Large-Scale Habitat Restoration for the wetland mitigation work the firm did with for the Border Coast Regional Airport Authority. GHD’s Ellerslie Acoustic Barrier project for the New Zealand Transport Agency received the Excellence in Concrete for the Community award from Concrete3. The Australian Institute of Project Management recognized GHD for the firm's Pesticide Container Management in the Pacific. GHD received an Award of Merit, Environmental from Engineering News-Record for the firm's involvement in the closure of a Puerto Rico Dump and the construction of Eloy S. Inos Peace Park.

GHD Woodhead received the Harry Seidler Award for Commercial Architecture and a national award for sustainable architecture from the Australian Institute of Architects for the design of the Barwon Water HQ in Geelong, Australia.

GHD has been appointed as the Fund Coordinator for the Australian Government’s Water for Women Fund, an initiative of the Australian Government to improve the health, gender equality and wellbeing of Asian and Pacific communities through socially-inclusive and sustainable Water, Sanitation and Hygiene (WASH) programs.

Survey by GHD following COVID-19 
In April 2021, GHD conducted a survey across the UK that revealed that 40% of people in the UK are considering moving to another location as a result of the COVID-19 Pandemic.

References 

Construction and civil engineering companies of Australia
International engineering consulting firms
Engineering consulting firms of Australia
Construction and civil engineering companies established in 1928
Australian companies established in 1928
Privately held companies of Australia